Marie Dionne Warwick (born December 12, 1940) is an American singer, actress, and television host.

Warwick ranks among the 40 biggest U.S. hit makers between 1955 and 1999, based on her chart history on Billboard's Hot 100 pop singles chart. She is the second-most charted female vocalist during the rock era (1955–1999). She is also one of the most-charted vocalists of all time, with 56 of her singles making the Hot 100 between 1962 and 1998 (12 of them Top Ten), and 80 singles in total – either solo or collaboratively – making the Hot 100, R&B or adult contemporary charts. Dionne ranks number 74 on the Billboard Hot 100's "Greatest Artists of all time".

During her career, Warwick has sold more than 100 million records worldwide and she has won many awards, including six Grammy Awards. Warwick has been inducted into the Hollywood Walk of Fame, the Grammy Hall of Fame, the R&B Music Hall of Fame and the Apollo Theater Walk of Fame. In 2019 she won the Grammy Lifetime Achievement Award. Three of her songs ("Walk On By", "Alfie" and "Don't Make Me Over") have been inducted into the Grammy Hall of Fame. She is a former Goodwill Ambassador for the UN's Food and Agriculture Organization.

Early life 
Marie Dionne Warrick, later Warwick, was born in East Orange, New Jersey to Lee Drinkard and Mancel Warrick. Her mother was manager of the Drinkard Singers, and her father was a Pullman porter, chef, record promoter and CPA. Dionne was named after her aunt on her mother's side. She had a sister, Delia ("Dee Dee"), who died in 2008, and a brother, Mancel Jr., who was killed in an accident in 1968 at age 21. Her parents were both African American, and she also has Native American and Dutch ancestry.

She was raised in East Orange, New Jersey and was a Girl Scout for a time. After finishing East Orange High School in 1959, Warwick pursued her passion at the Hartt College of Music in West Hartford, Connecticut. She landed some work with her group singing backing vocals for recording sessions in New York City. During one session, Warwick met Burt Bacharach, who hired her to record demos featuring songs written by him and lyricist Hal David. She later landed her own record deal.

Career

Drinkard Singers 
Many of Warwick's family were members of the Drinkard Singers, a family gospel group and RCA recording artists who frequently performed throughout the New York metropolitan area. The original group, known as the Drinkard Jubilairs, consisted of Cissy, Anne, Larry, and Nicky, and later included Warwick's grandparents, Nicholas and Delia Drinkard, and their children: William, Lee (Warwick's mother) and Hansom. When the Drinkard Singers performed on TV Gospel Time, Dionne Warwick had her television performance debut.

Marie instructed the group, and they were managed by Lee. As they became more successful, Lee and Marie began performing with the group, and they were augmented by pop/R&B singer Judy Clay, whom Lee had unofficially adopted. Elvis Presley eventually expressed an interest in having them join his touring entourage. Dionne began singing gospel as a child at the New Hope Baptist Church in Newark, New Jersey.

The Gospelaires 
Other singers joined the Gospelaires from time to time, including Judy Clay, Cissy Houston and Doris "Rikii" Troy, whose chart selection "Just One Look", when she recorded it in 1963, featured backing vocals from the Gospelaires. After personnel changes (Dionne and Doris left the group after achieving solo success), the Gospelaires became the recording group the Sweet Inspirations, who had some chart success, but were much sought-after as studio background singers. The Gospelaires and later the Sweet Inspirations performed on many records cut in New York City for artists such as Garnet Mimms, the Drifters, Jerry Butler, Solomon Burke and later Warwick's recordings, Aretha Franklin and Elvis Presley. Warwick recalled, in 2002's Biography, that "a man came running frantically backstage at the Apollo and said he needed background singers for a session for Sam "the Man" Taylor and old big-mouth here spoke up and said 'We'll do it!' and we left and did the session. I wish I remembered the gentleman's name because he was responsible for the beginning of my professional career." 

The backstage encounter led to the group being asked to sing background sessions at recording studios in New York. Soon, the group were in demand in New York music circles for their background work for such artists as the Drifters, Ben E. King, Chuck Jackson, Dinah Washington, Ronnie "the Hawk" Hawkins, and Solomon Burke, among many others. Warwick remembered, in Biography, that after school, they would catch a bus from East Orange to the Port Authority Terminal, then take the subway to recording studios in Manhattan, perform their background gigs and be back at home in East Orange in time to do their school homework. Her background vocal work would continue while Warwick pursued her studies at Hartt.

Discovery 
While she was performing background on the Drifters' recording of their 1962 release "Mexican Divorce", Warwick's voice and star presence were noticed by the song's composer, Burt Bacharach, a Brill Building songwriter who was writing songs with many other songwriters, including lyricist Hal David. According to a July 14, 1967, article on Warwick in Time, Bacharach stated, "She has a tremendous strong side and a delicacy when singing softly — like miniature ships in bottles." Musically, she was no "play-safe girl. What emotion I could get away with!" During the session, Bacharach asked Warwick if she would be interested in recording demonstration recordings of his compositions to pitch the tunes to record labels, paying her $12.50 per demo recording session. One such demo, "It's Love That Really Counts"destined to be recorded by Scepter-signed act the Shirellescaught the attention of the President of Scepter Records, Florence Greenberg, who, according to Current Biography (1969 Yearbook), told Bacharach, "Forget the song, get the girl!"

Warwick was signed to Bacharach's and David's production company, according to Warwick, which in turn was signed to Scepter Records in 1962 by Greenberg. The partnership would provide Bacharach with the freedom to produce Warwick without the control of recording company executives and company A&R men. Warwick's musical ability and education would also allow Bacharach to compose more challenging tunes. The demo version of "It's Love That Really Counts", along with her original demo of "Make It Easy on Yourself", would surface on Warwick's debut Scepter album, Presenting Dionne Warwick, which was released in early 1963.

Early stardom 
In November 1962, Scepter Records released her first solo single, "Don't Make Me Over", the title of which Warwick supplied herself when she snapped the phrase at producers Burt Bacharach and Hal David in anger. Warwick had found out that "Make It Easy on Yourself" — a song on which she had recorded the original demo and had wanted to be her first single release — had been given to another artist, Jerry Butler. From the phrase "don't make me over", Bacharach and David created their first top 40 pop hit (No. 21) and a top 5 U.S. R&B hit. Warrick's name was misspelled on the single's label, and she began using the new spelling, "Warwick", both professionally and personally.

After "Don't Make Me Over" hit in 1962, she answered the call of her manager, left school and went on a tour of France, where critics crowned her "Paris' Black Pearl", having been introduced on stage at Paris Olympia that year by Marlene Dietrich.

The two immediate follow-ups to "Don't Make Me Over" — "This Empty Place" (with "B" side "Wishin' and Hopin'" later recorded by Dusty Springfield) and "Make The Music Play" — charted briefly in the top 100. Her fourth single, "Anyone Who Had a Heart", released in November 1963, was Warwick's first top 10 pop hit (No. 8) in the U.S. and an international million seller. This was followed by "Walk On By" in April 1964, another major international hit and million seller that solidified her career. For the rest of the 1960s, Warwick was a fixture on the U.S. and Canadian charts, and much of her output from 1962 to 1971 was written and produced by the Bacharach/David team.

Warwick weathered the British Invasion better than most American artists. Her biggest UK hits were "Walk On By" and "Do You Know the Way to San Jose?" In the UK, a number of Bacharach-David-Warwick songs were recorded by British singers Cilla Black, Sandie Shaw and Dusty Springfield, most notably Black's "Anyone Who Had a Heart" which went to No. 1 in the UK. This upset Warwick, who described feeling insulted when told that in the UK, record company executives wanted her songs recorded by someone else. Warwick met Cilla Black while on tour in Britain. She recalled what she said to her: "I told her that "You're My World" would be my next single in the States. I honestly believe that if I'd sneezed on my next record, then Cilla would have sneezed on hers too. There was no imagination in her recording." Warwick later covered two of Cilla's songs – "You're My World" appeared on Dionne Warwick in Valley of the Dolls, released in 1968 and on the soundtrack to Alfie.

Warwick was named the Bestselling Female Vocalist in the Cash Box Magazine poll in 1964, with six chart hits in that year. Cash Box named her the Top Female Vocalist in 1969, 1970 and 1971. In the 1967 Cash Box poll, she was second to Petula Clark, and in 1968's poll second to Aretha Franklin. Playboys influential Music Poll of 1970 named her the Top Female Vocalist. In 1969, Harvard's Hasty Pudding Society named her Woman of the Year.

In the May 21, 1965 Time cover article entitled "The Sound of the Sixties", Warwick's sound was described as:

Swinging World. Scholarly articles probe the relationship between the Beatles and the nouvelle vague films of Jean-Luc Godard, discuss "the brio and elegance" of Dionne Warwick's singing style as a 'pleasurable but complex' event to be 'experienced without condescension.' In chic circles, anyone damning rock 'n' roll is labeled not only square but uncultured. For inspirational purposes, such hip artists as Robert Rauschenberg, Larry Rivers and Andy Warhol occasionally paint while listening to rock 'n' roll music. Explains Warhol: "It makes me mindless, and I paint better." After gallery openings in Manhattan, the black-tie gatherings often adjourn to a discothèque.

In 1965, Eon Productions intended to use Warwick's song titled "Mr. Kiss Kiss Bang Bang" as the theme song of the James Bond film Thunderball, until Albert R. Broccoli insisted that the theme song include the film's title. A new song was composed and recorded in the eleventh hour titled "Thunderball", performed by Tom Jones. The melody of "Mr. Kiss Kiss Bang Bang" remains a major component of the film score. The Ultimate Edition DVD of Thunderball has the Warwick song playing over the titles on one of the commentary track extras, and the song was released on the 30th anniversary CD of Bond songs.

Mid-1960s to early 1970s 

The mid-1960s to early 1970s were a more successful time period for Warwick, who saw a string of gold-selling albums and Top 20 and Top 10 hit singles. "Message to Michael", a Bacharach-David composition that the duo was certain was a "man's song", became a top 10 hit for Warwick in May 1966. The January 1967 LP Here Where There Is Love was her first RIAA certified Gold album, and featured "Alfie" and two 1966 hits: "Trains and Boats and Planes" and "I Just Don't Know What to Do with Myself". "Alfie" had become a radio hit when disc jockeys across the nation began to play the album cut early in 1967. "Alfie" was released as the "B" side of a Bacharach/David ballad, "The Beginning of Loneliness", which charted in the Hot 100. Disc jockeys flipped the single and made it a double-sided hit. Bacharach had been contracted to produce "Alfie" for the Michael Caine film of the same name and wanted Warwick to sing the tune, but the British producers wanted a British subject to cut the tune. Cilla Black was selected to record the song, and her version peaked at No. 95 upon its release in the US. A cover version by Cher used in the American prints of the film peaked at No. 33. In the UK and Australia, Black's version was a Top 10 hit.

Her follow-up to "I Say a Little Prayer", "(Theme from) Valley of the Dolls", was unusual in several respects. It was not written by Burt Bacharach and Hal David; it was the "B" side of her "I Say a Little Prayer" single, and it was a song that she almost did not record. While the film version of Valley of the Dolls was being made, actress Barbara Parkins suggested that Warwick be considered to sing the film's theme song, written by songwriting team André and Dory Previn. The song was to be recorded by Judy Garland, who was subsequently fired from the film. Warwick performed the song, and when the film became a success in the early weeks of 1968, disc jockeys flipped the single and made the single one of the biggest double-sided hits of the rock era and another million seller. At the time, RIAA rules allowed only one side of a double-sided hit single to be certified as gold, but Scepter awarded Warwick an "in-house award" to recognize "(Theme from) Valley of the Dolls" as a million selling tune.

Warwick had re-recorded a Pat Williams-arranged version of the theme at A&R Studios in New York because contractual restrictions with her label would not allow the Warwick version from the film to be included on the 20th Century Fox soundtrack LP, and reverse legal restrictions would not allow the film version to be used anyplace else in a commercial LP. The LP Dionne Warwick in Valley of the Dolls, released in early 1968 and containing the re-recorded version of the movie theme (No. 2 for three weeks), "Do You Know the Way to San Jose?" and several new Bacharach-David compositions, hit the No. 6 position on the Billboard album chart and would remain on the chart for over a year. The film soundtrack LP, without Warwick vocals, failed to impress the public, while Dionne Warwick in Valley of the Dolls earned an RIAA Gold certification.

The single "Do You Know the Way to San Jose?" (an international million seller and a Top 10 hit in several countries, including the UK, Canada, Australia, South Africa, Japan and Mexico) was also a double-sided hit, with the "B" side "Let Me Be Lonely" charting at No. 79. More hits followed into 1971, including "Who Is Gonna Love Me" (#32, 1968) with "B" side, "(There's) Always Something There to Remind Me" becoming another double-sided hit; "Promises, Promises" (#19, 1968); "This Girl's in Love with You" (#7, 1969); "The April Fools" (#37, 1969); "You've Lost That Lovin' Feelin'" (#15, 1969); "I'll Never Fall in Love Again" (#6 Pop, #1 AC, 1969); "Make It Easy on Yourself" (#37 Pop, #10 AC, 1970); "Let Me Go to Him" (#32 Pop, #4 AC, 1970); and "Paper Mache" (#43 Pop, #3 AC), 1970). Warwick's final Bacharach/David penned single on the Scepter label was March 1971's "Who Gets the Guy" (#52 Pop, #6 AC), 1971), and her final "official" Scepter single release was "He's Moving On" b/w "Amanda", (#83 Pop, #12 AC) both from the soundtrack of the motion picture adaptation of Jacqueline Susann's The Love Machine.

Warwick had become the priority act of Scepter Records with the release of "Anyone Who Had a Heart" in 1963. Other Scepter LPs certified RIAA Gold include Dionne Warwick's Golden Hits Part 1 released in 1967 and The Dionne Warwicke Story: A Decade of Gold released in 1971. By the end of 1971, Warwick had sold an estimated 35 million singles and albums internationally in less than nine years and more than 16 million singles in the U.S. alone. Exact figures of her sales are unknown and probably underestimated, due to Scepter Records' apparently lax accounting policies and the company policy of not submitting recordings for RIAA audit. Warwick became the first Scepter artist to request RIAA audits of her recordings in 1967 with the release of "I Say a Little Prayer".

On September 17, 1969, CBS Television aired Warwick's first television special, entitled The Dionne Warwick Chevy Special. Warwick's guests were Burt Bacharach, George Kirby, Glen Campbell, and Creedence Clearwater Revival. In 1970, Warwick formed her own label, Sonday Records, of which she was president. Sonday was distributed by Scepter.

In 1970 she was a performer on the prestigious Royal Variety Performance at the London Palladium, singing The Look of Love, What the World Needs Now and Come Together.

In 1971, Warwick left the family atmosphere of Scepter Records for Warner Bros. Records, for a $5 million contract, the most lucrative recording contract given to a female vocalist up to that time, according to Variety. Warwick's last LP for Scepter was the soundtrack for the motion picture The Love Machine, in which she appeared in an uncredited cameo, released in July 1971. In 1975, Bacharach and David sued Scepter Records for an accurate accounting of royalties due the team from their recordings with Warwick and labelmate B.J. Thomas. They were awarded almost $600,000 and the rights to all Bacharach/David recordings on the Scepter label. The label, with the defection of Warwick to Warner Bros. Records, filed for bankruptcy in 1975 and was sold to Springboard International Records in 1976.

Following her signing with Warners, with Bacharach and David as writers and producers, Warwick returned to New York City's A&R Studios in late 1971 to begin recording her first album for the new label, the self-titled Dionne (not to be confused with her later Arista debut album) in January 1972. The album peaked at No. 57 on the Billboard Hot 100 Album Chart. In 1972, Burt Bacharach and Hal David scored and wrote the tunes for the motion picture Lost Horizon. However, the film was panned by the critics, and in the fallout, the songwriting duo decided to terminate their working relationship. The break-up left Warwick devoid of their services as her producers and songwriters. She was contractually obligated to fulfill her contract with Warners without Bacharach and David, and she would team with a variety of producers during her tenure with the label.

Faced with the prospect of being sued by Warner Bros. Records due to the breakup of Bacharach/David and their failure to honor their contract with Warwick, she filed a $5.5 million lawsuit against her former partners for breach of contract. The suit was settled out of court in 1979 for $5 million, including the rights to all Warwick recordings produced by Bacharach and David.

Also in 1971, Warwick had her name changed to "Warwicke" per the advice of Linda Goodman, an astrologer friend, who believed it would bring greater success. A few years later, she reverted to the old spelling after a string of disappointments and an absence from the Billboard top 40.

Warner era (1972–1978) 

Without the guidance and songwriting that Bacharach/David had provided, Warwick's career stalled in the early 1970s although she remained a top concert draw throughout the world. There were no big hits during the early and mid part of the decade, aside from 1974's "Then Came You", recorded as a duet with the Spinners and produced by Thom Bell. Bell later noted, "Dionne made a (strange) face when we finished [the song]. She didn't like it much, but I knew we had something. So we ripped a dollar in two, signed each half and exchanged them. I told her, 'If it doesn't go number one, I'll send you my half.' When it took off, Dionne sent hers back. There was an apology on it." It was her first U.S. No. 1 hit on the Billboard Hot 100. Other than this success, Warwick's five years on Warner Bros. Records produced no other major hits, but "Then Came You" was issued by co-owned Atlantic Records, the Spinners' label. Two notable songs recorded during this period were "His House and Me" and "Once You Hit The Road" (#79 pop, #5 R&B, #22 Adult Contemporary), both of which were produced in 1975 by Thom Bell. 

Warwick recorded five albums with Warners: Dionne (1972), produced by Bacharach and David and a modest chart success; Just Being Myself (1973), produced by Holland-Dozier-Holland;
Then Came You (1975), produced by Jerry Ragovoy; Track of the Cat (1975), produced by Thom Bell; and Love at First Sight (1977), produced by Steve Barri and Michael Omartian. Her five-year contract with Warners expired in 1977, and with that, she ended her stay at the label.  Warwick's dry spell on the American charts ended with her signing to Arista Records in 1979, where she began a second highly successful run of hit records and albums well into the late 1980s.

Move to Arista, 1979 
With the move to Arista Records and the release of her RIAA-certified million seller "I'll Never Love This Way Again" in 1979, Warwick was again enjoying top success on the charts. The song was produced by Barry Manilow. The accompanying album, Dionne, was certified Platinum in the United States for sales exceeding one million units. The album peaked at No. 12 on the Billboard Album Chart and made the Top 10 of the Billboard R&B Albums Chart. Warwick had been personally signed and guided by the label's founder Clive Davis, who told her, "You may be ready to give the business up, but the business is not ready to give you up." Warwick's next single release was another major hit. "Deja Vu" was co-written by Isaac Hayes and hit No. 1 Adult Contemporary as well as No. 15 on Billboards Hot 100. In 1980, Warwick won the NARAS Grammy Awards for Best Pop Vocal Performance, Female for "I'll Never Love This Way Again" and Best R&B Vocal Performance, Female for "Déjà Vu". She became the first female artist in the history of the awards to win in both categories the same year. Her second Arista album, 1980's No Night So Long sold 500,000 U.S. copies and featured the title track which became a major success — hitting #1 Adult Contemporary and #23 on Billboards Hot 100 — and the album peaked at No. 23 on the Billboard Albums Chart.

In January 1980, while under contract to Arista Records, Warwick hosted a two-hour TV special called Solid Gold '79. This was adapted into the weekly one-hour show Solid Gold, which she hosted throughout 1980 and 1981 and again in 1985–86. Major highlights of each show were the duets she performed with her co-hosts, which often included some of Warwick's hits and her co-hosts' hits, intermingled and arranged by Solid Gold musical director Michael Miller. Another highlight in each show was Warwick's vocal rendition of the Solid Gold theme, composed by Miller (with lyrics by Dean Pitchford).

After a brief appearance in the Top Forty in early 1982 with Johnny Mathis on "Friends in Love" — from the album of the same name — Warwick's next hit later that same year was her full-length collaboration with Barry Gibb of the Bee Gees for the album Heartbreaker. The song became one of Warwick's biggest international hits, returning her to the Top 10 of Billboard's Hot 100 as well as No. 1 Adult Contemporary and No. 2 in both the UK and Australia. The tune was also a Top 10 hit throughout continental Europe, Australia (No. 1), Japan, South Africa, Canada and Asia. The title track was taken from the album of the same name which sold over 3 million copies internationally and earned Warwick an RIAA Gold record award in the US. In Britain, the disc was certified Platinum. Warwick later stated to Wesley Hyatt in his Billboard Book of Number One Adult Contemporary Hits that she was not initially fond of "Heartbreaker" but recorded the tune because she trusted the Bee Gees' judgment that it would be a hit. The project came about when Clive Davis was attending his aunt's wedding in Orlando, Florida in early 1982 and spoke with Barry Gibb. Gibb mentioned that he had always been a fan of Warwick's, and Davis arranged for Warwick and the Bee Gees to discuss a project. Warwick and the Gibb brothers obviously hit it off as both the album and the title single were released in October 1982 to massive success.

In 1983, Warwick released How Many Times Can We Say Goodbye, produced by Luther Vandross. The album's most successful single was the title track, "How Many Times Can We Say Goodbye", a Warwick/Vandross duet, which peaked at No. 27 on the Billboard Hot 100. It also became a Top 10 hit on the Adult Contemporary and R&B charts. The album peaked at No. 57 on the Billboard album chart. Of note was a reunion with the original Shirelles on Warwick's cover of "Will You (Still) Love Me Tomorrow?" The album Finder of Lost Loves followed in 1984 and reunited her with both Barry Manilow and Burt Bacharach, who was writing with his then current lyricist partner and wife, Carole Bayer Sager. In 1985, Warwick contributed her voice to the multi-Grammy Award winning charity song "We Are the World", along with vocalists like Michael Jackson, Diana Ross, and Ray Charles. The song spent four consecutive weeks at No. 1 on the Billboard Hot 100 chart. It was the year's biggest hit — certified four times Platinum in the United States alone.

In 1985, Warwick once again collaborated on the song "That's What Friends are For". It was the first time they had worked together since the 1970s, when Warwick felt abandoned by Bacharach and Hal David dissolving their partnership. Warwick said of their reconciliation:

Warwick recorded "That's What Friends are For" as a benefit single for the American Foundation for AIDS Research (AmFAR) alongside Gladys Knight, Elton John and Stevie Wonder in 1985. The single, credited to "Dionne and Friends", was released in October and eventually raised over three million dollars for that cause. The tune was a triple No. 1 — R&B, Adult Contemporary, and four weeks at the summit on the Billboard Hot 100 in early 1986 — selling close to two million 45s in the United States alone. "Working against AIDS, especially after years of raising money for work on many blood-related diseases such as sickle-cell anemia, seemed the right thing to do. You have to be granite not to want to help people with AIDS, because the devastation that it causes is so painful to see. I was so hurt to see my friend die with such agony", Warwick told The Washington Post in 1988. "I am tired of hurting and it does hurt." The single won the performers the NARAS Grammy Award for Best Pop Performance by a Duo or Group with Vocal, as well as Song of the Year for its writers, Bacharach and Bayer Sager. It also was ranked by Billboard magazine as the most popular song of 1986. With this single Warwick also released her most successful album of the 1980s, titled Friends, which reached No. 12 on Billboard's album chart.
In 1987, Dionne Warwick won the Special Recognition Award at the American Music Awards for "That's What Friends Are For".

In 1987, Warwick scored another hit with "Love Power". Her eighth career No. 1 Adult Contemporary hit, it also reached No. 5 in R&B and No. 12 on Billboard's Hot 100. A duet with Jeffrey Osborne, it was also written by Burt Bacharach and Carole Bayer Sager, and it was featured in Warwick's album Reservations for Two. The album's title song, a duet with Kashif, was also a chart hit. Other artists featured on the album included Smokey Robinson and June Pointer.

1990s to 2000 
During the 1990s, Warwick hosted infomercials for the Psychic Friends Network, which featured self-described psychic Linda Georgian. The 900 number psychic service was active from 1991 to 1998. According to press statements throughout the 1990s, the program was the most successful infomercial for several years and Warwick earned in excess of three million dollars per year as spokesperson for the network. In 1998, Inphomation, the corporation owning the network, filed for bankruptcy and Warwick ended her association with the organization. Warwick's longtime friend and tour manager Henry Carr acknowledged that "when Dionne was going through an airport and a child recognized her as 'that psychic lady on TV', Dionne was crushed and said she had worked too hard as an entertainer to become known as 'the psychic lady.

Warwick's most publicized album during this period was 1993's Friends Can Be Lovers, which was produced in part by Ian Devaney and Lisa Stansfield. Featured on the album was "Sunny Weather Lover", which was the first song that Burt Bacharach and Hal David had written together for Warwick since 1972. It was Warwick's lead single in the United States, and was heavily promoted by Arista, but failed to chart. A follow-up "Where My Lips Have Been" peaked at No. 95 on the Hot R&B/Hip-Hop Singles & Tracks. The 1994 Aquarela Do Brasil album marked the end of Warwick's contract with Arista Records. In 1990, Warwick recorded the song "It's All Over" with former member of Modern Talking Dieter Bohlen (Blue System). The single peaked at No. 60 (No. 33 airplay) on the German pop charts and it was covered on Blue System's album Déjà Vu.

In 1993, Forrest Sawyer, host of the ABC news/entertainment program Day One, alleged financial improprieties by the Warwick Foundation, founded in 1989 to benefit AIDS patients, and particularly Warwick's charity concert performances organized to benefit the organization as "America's Ambassador of Health". The network news magazine story, "That's What Friends Are For", reported that the Warwick Foundation was operating at over 90% administrative cost, donating only about 3% of the money it raised to AIDS groups. Several AIDS groups and nonprofit experts criticized her foundation, including an AIDS group in the Virgin Islands that claimed she nearly bankrupted them after extravagant expenses left nothing for local charities. ABC reported that Warwick flew first class and was accommodated at first-class hotels for charity concerts and events in which she participated for the Warwick Foundation, managed by her close confident, Guy Draper, a former chief of protocol for former Washington DC Mayor Marion Barry, and who had a history of bankruptcies. Warwick alleged that the ABC report was racially motivated and threatened to sue ABC News for defamation, although a suit was never filed. The Internal Revenue Service began an investigation of the Warwick Foundation after other complaints were filed, and the Warwick Foundation was later dissolved. ABC's story was nominated for a national Emmy award in 1994 and won a prestigious Investigative Reporters and Editors national television award in 1993.

2000s to 2010 

On October 16, 2002, Warwick was nominated to be Goodwill Ambassador of the Food and Agriculture Organization of the United Nations (FAO).

In 2004, Warwick's first Christmas album was released. The CD, entitled My Favorite Time of the Year featured jazzy interpretations of many holiday classics. In 2007, Rhino Records re-released the CD with new cover art.

In 2005, Warwick was honored by Oprah Winfrey at her Legends Ball. She appeared on the May 24, 2006, fifth-season finale of American Idol. Warwick sang a medley of "Walk On By" and "That's What Friends Are For", with longtime collaborator Burt Bacharach accompanying her on the piano.

In 2006, Warwick signed with Concord Records after a fifteen-year tenure at Arista, which had ended in 1994. Her first and only release for the label was My Friends and Me, a duets album containing reworkings of her old hits, very similar to her 1998 CD Dionne Sings Dionne. Among her singing partners were Gloria Estefan, Olivia Newton-John, Wynonna Judd and Reba McEntire. The album peaked at No. 66 on the Top R&B/Hip-Hop Albums chart. The album was produced by her son, Damon Elliott. A follow-up album featuring Warwick's old hits as duets with male vocalists was planned, but the project was cancelled. The relationship with Concord concluded with the release of My Friends and Me. A compilation CD of her greatest hits and love songs, The Love Collection, entered the UK album chart at number 27 on February 16, 2008.

Warwick's second gospel album, Why We Sing, was released on February 26, 2008, in the United Kingdom and on April 1, 2008, in the United States. The album features guest spots by her sister Dee Dee Warwick and BeBe Winans.

On October 18, 2008, Dee Dee died in a nursing home in Essex County, New Jersey. She had been in failing health for several months.

On November 24, 2008, Warwick was the star performer on "Divas II", a UK ITV1 special. The show also featured Rihanna, Leona Lewis, the Sugababes, Pink, Gabriella Climi and Anastacia.

In 2008, Warwick began recording an album of songs from the Sammy Cahn and Jack Wolf songbooks. The finished recording, entitled Only Trust Your Heart, was released in 2011.

On October 20, 2009, Starlight Children's Foundation and New Gold Music Ltd. released a song that Warwick had recorded about ten years prior called "Starlight". The lyrics were written by Dean Pitchford, prolific writer of Fame, screenwriter of — and sole or joint lyricist of every song in the soundtrack of — the original 1984 film Footloose, and lyricist of the Solid Gold theme. The music had been composed by Bill Goldstein, whose versatile career included the original music for NBC's Fame TV series. Warwick, Pitchford and Goldstein announced that they would be donating 100% of their royalties to Starlight Children's Foundation, to support Starlight's mission to help seriously ill children and their families cope with pain, fear and isolation through entertainment, education and family activities.
When Bill and Dean brought this song to me, I instantly felt connected to its message of shining a little light into the lives of people who need it most", said Warwick. "I admire the work of Starlight Children's Foundation and know that if the song brings hope to even just one sick child, we have succeeded.

2011 to 2019 

In 2011, the New Jazz style CD Only Trust Your Heart was released, featuring many Sammy Cahn songs. In March 2011, Warwick appeared on The Celebrity Apprentice 4. Her charity was the Hunger Project. She was dismissed from her "apprenticeship" to Donald Trump during the fourth task of the season. In February 2012, Warwick performed "Walk On By" on The Jonathan Ross Show. She also received the Goldene Kamera Musical Lifetime Achievement Award in Germany, and performed "That's What Friends Are For" at the ceremony.

On May 28, 2012, Warwick headlined the World Hunger Day concert at London's Royal Albert Hall. She sang "One World One Song", specially written for the Hunger Project by Tony Hatch and Tim Holder and was joined by Joe McElderry, the London Community Gospel Choir and a choir from Woodbridge School, Woodbridge, Suffolk.

In 2012, the 50th anniversary CD entitled NOW was released; Warwick recorded 12 Bacharach/David tracks produced by Phil Ramone.

On September 19, 2013, she collaborated with country singer Billy Ray Cyrus for his song "Hope Is Just Ahead".

In 2014, the duets album Feels So Good was released. Funkytowngrooves re-issued the remastered Arista albums No Night So Long, How Many Times Can We Say Goodbye ("So Amazing"), and Finder of Lost Loves ("Without Your Love"), all expanded with bonus material.

In December 2015, Warwick's website released the Tropical Love EP with five tracks previously unreleased from the Aquarel Do Brasil Sessions in 1994 – To Say Goodbye (Pra Dizer Adeus) with Edu Lobo – Love Me – Lullaby – Bridges (Travessia) – Rainy Day Girl with Ivan Lins.

A Heartbreaker two-disc expanded edition was planned for a 2016 release by Funkytowngrooves, which would include the original Heartbreaker album and up to 15 bonus tracks consisting of a mixture of unreleased songs, alternate takes, and instrumentals, with more remastered and expanded Arista albums to follow. In 2016, she was inducted into the Rhythm & Blues Hall of Fame.

In 2017, she performed a benefit in Chicago for the Center on Halsted, an organization that contributes to the LGBTQ community. This event was co-chaired by Rahm Emanuel and Barack Obama. Also that year, she made a cameo appearance in the Christian drama Let There Be Light directed by Kevin Sorbo.

In 2019 she was awarded the Grammy Lifetime Achievement Award.

2020s to present 
In 2020, she appeared as "Mouse" on season three of The Masked Singer. She was eliminated in the fifth round, but came back during the first part of the season three finale to sing "What the World Needs Now is Love" with the finalists Night Angel, Frog and Turtle as a tribute to the healthcare workers working on the front lines during the coronavirus pandemic. This performance was created after the season wrapped production in March. Warwick made a guest appearance during Gladys Knight's and Patti Labelle's Verzuz battle. Together they performed Warwick's song, "That's What Friends Are For". They closed with their collaborative song "Superwoman".

In My Life, as I See It: An Autobiography, Warwick lists her honorary doctorate from Hartt among those awarded by six other institutions: Hartt College, Bethune-Cookman University, Shaw University, Columbia College of Chicago, Lincoln College, Illinois [May 2010, Doctor of Arts (hon.)], and University of Maryland Eastern Shore.

On February 10, 2021, Dionne got nominated for the Rock and Roll Hall of Fame for the first time.

On December 3, 2021, Dionne was honored with a star on the Palm Springs Walk of Stars.

Warwick appears in a documentary revolving around her life and career, Dionne Warwick: Don't Make Me Over, which had its world premiere at the Toronto International Film Festival in September 2021. Organizers of the Toronto Film Festival announced that she would be honored in the upcoming event as a music icon. On November 26, 2021, Warwick released the single "Nothing's Impossible" a duet featuring Chance the Rapper. Two charities are being supported by the duet: SocialWorks, a Chicago-based nonprofit that Chance founded to empower the youth through the arts, education and civic engagement, and Hunger: Not Impossible, a text-based service connecting kids and their families in need with prepaid, nutritious, to-go meals from local restaurants.

On January 1, 2023, Warwick's documentary, Dionne Warwick: Don't Make Me Over, premiered on national television on CNN.

Voice and artistry 
Warwick is a contralto, particularly known for her signature musicality and "husky" singing voice. The New Yorker theatre critic Hilton Als reported that, early in her singing career, Warwick's wide vocal range "allowed her both to sing contralto low notes and to soar as a soprano". According to Mike Joyce of The Washington Post, some performances on Warwick's album Dionne Warwick Sings Cole Porter (1990) capture her warmth "and emphasize her subtle phrasing". In a separate review published in 1982, Joyce noted that Warwick's "magical" voice still manages to be "opaque, elusive, elegant" simultaneously, even when performing what he described as some of her most banal material in her discography. Reviewing a concert in 1983, The New York Times music critic Stephen Holden observed that Warwick's voice had deepened "into a near-baritone at its bottom end", resulting in "an ever-more fascinating vocal personality". Similarly, in 2006, Sarah Dempster of The Guardian observed that Warwick's voice "has deepened with age, lending a splendidly full-bodied finish to everything".

Music critics have described Warwick as the muse of songwriters Burt Bacharach and Hal David's, a term Bacharach himself has used to refer to the singer. Bacharach confirmed that they considered Warwick their "main artist", to whom they allowed first priority on new songs. MTV contributor Carol Cooper said Warwick's interpretation of their songs "established Warwick as the eloquent voice of wounded feminine pride", crediting her with making their material "even more unique and compelling". According to Michael Musto of The Village Voice, the singer's voice proved to be "the perfect venue for Bacharach-David hits", writing, "Dionne could do sultry, pained, wispy, and regretful, all with sophisticated phrasings that made her a vocal emblem for the ’60s heartbeat". The singer claims she did not find their material difficult to sing because they had been written specifically for her voice. Cooper identified their partnership as a precedent to the collaborations between R&B singer Toni Braxton, and songwriters Babyface and Diane Warren.

Musically, The New York Times music critic Stephen Holden and The Guardian's Ian Gittins described Warwick as a pop soul singer. However, AllMusic biographer William Ruhlmann found the singer particularly difficult to categorize as a vocalist, writing, "Although Warwick grew up singing in church, she is not a gospel singer. Ella Fitzgerald and Sarah Vaughan are clear influences, but she is not a jazz singer. R&B is also part of her background, yet she is not really a soul singer, either, at least not in the sense that Aretha Franklin is". Similar, AllMusic reviewer believes Warwick combines elements of jazz, R&B, and gospel, which ultimately result in a "pure pop singer". The Washington Informer senior editor D. Kevin McNeir reported that Warwick's delivery and stage presence are often described as "scintillating, soothing, sensual and soulful". A writer for the South Bend Tribune observed that Warwick is usually described as a "sophisticated" singer, while noting that this term "doesn’t place her in a specific musical category". A writer for The Guardian described Warwick as "one of the greatest pop singers of all time", while Mikael Wood of the Los Angeles Times named her "that one-of-a-kind instrument that defined pop sophistication in the mid-1960s".

In recent years, Warwick has become known for sharing candid, straightforward opinions about various topics on the social media platform Twitter, being nicknamed the "Queen of Twitter" by several media publications.

Personal life 

In 1966, Warwick married actor and drummer William Elliott; they divorced in May 1967. They reconciled and were remarried in Milan, Italy, in August 1967. On January 18, 1969, while living in East Orange, New Jersey, she gave birth to her first son, David Elliott. In 1973, her second son Damon Elliott was born. On May 30, 1975, the couple separated and Warwick was granted a divorce in December 1975 in Los Angeles. The court denied Elliott's request for $2,000 a month in support pending a community property trial, and for $5,000, when he insisted he was making $500 a month in comparison to Warwick making $100,000 a month. Warwick stated "I was the breadwinner. The male ego is a fragile thing. It's hard when the woman is the breadwinner. All my life, the only man who ever took care of me financially was my father. I have always taken care of myself."

In 2002, Warwick was arrested at Miami International Airport for possession of marijuana. It was discovered that she had 11 suspected marijuana cigarettes inside her carry-on luggage, hidden in a lipstick container. She was charged with possessing marijuana totaling less than five grams.
Warwick made the Top 250 Delinquent Taxpayers List published in October 2007. Warwick was listed with a tax delinquency of $2,665,305.83 in personal income tax and a tax lien was filed July 24, 1997. The IRS eventually discovered that a large portion of the lien was due to an accounting error and revoked $1.2mil of the tax lien in 2009.

Warwick lived in Brazil, a country she first visited in the early 1960s, from an indeterminate date until 2005, according to an interview with JazzWax, when she moved back to the United States to be near her ailing mother and sister. She became so entranced by Brazil that she studied Portuguese and divided her time between Rio de Janeiro and São Paulo. In April 2010, in an interview on talk-show Programa do Jô, she said Brazil was the place where she intended to spend the rest of her life after retiring.

In 1993, her older son David, a former Los Angeles police officer, co-wrote with Terry Steele the Warwick-Whitney Houston duet "Love Will Find a Way", featured on her album Friends Can Be Lovers. Since 2002, he has periodically toured with and performed duets with his mother (along with being the drummer of her touring band), and had his acting debut in the film Ali as the singer Sam Cooke. David became a singer-songwriter, with Luther Vandross' "Here and Now" among others to his credit.

Her second son, Damon Elliott, is a music producer, who has worked with Mýa, Pink, Christina Aguilera and Keyshia Cole. He arranged and produced his mother's 2006 Concord release My Friends and Me. She received a 2014 Grammy Award nomination in the Traditional Pop Category for her 2013 album release, Now.

On January 24, 2015, Warwick was hospitalized after a fall in the shower at her home. After ankle surgery, she was discharged from the hospital.

Bankruptcy 
Warwick declared Chapter 7 bankruptcy in New Jersey on March 21, 2013. Due to the reported mismanagement of her business affairs, she listed liabilities that included nearly $7 million owed to the Internal Revenue Service for the years 1991 to 1999 and more than $3 million in business taxes owed to the state of California. Unable to work out an agreement with tax officials, she and her attorney decided that declaring bankruptcy would be the best course of action.

Relations 
Warwick's sister Dee Dee Warwick also had a successful singing career, scoring several notable R&B hits in the US, including the original version of "I'm Gonna Make You Love Me". Dee Dee recorded the original version of the song "You're No Good", which later became a 1963 No. 5 R&B hit for Betty Everett, a 1964 No. 3 UK hit for The Swinging Blue Jeans and a 1975 No. 1 pop hit for Linda Ronstadt. In 1966, the Swinging Blue Jeans had a No. 31 UK hit with a cover of Dionne's "Don't Make Me Over", thus appearing in the UK Singles Chart with covers of songs from both Warwick sisters.

Warwick's maternal aunt is gospel-trained vocalist Cissy Houston, mother of Warwick's cousin, singer Whitney Houston.

In her 2011 autobiography, My Life, as I See It, Warwick notes that opera diva Leontyne Price is a maternal cousin.

Discography

Tours 
 Dionne Warwick Tour (1966)
 Dionne: 40 Anniversary Tour (2002)
 Soul Divas Tour (2004)
 An Evening with Dionne (2007)
 She's Back: One Last Time (2022)

Awards and honors 
Grammy Awards

Grammy Hall of Fame

American Music Awards

Billboard Music Awards

RIAA

People's Choice Awards

NAACP Image Awards

ASCAP Awards

Rhythm & Blues Foundation

Women's World Awards

Trumpet Awards

Ride of Fame

Cash Box Magazine Annual Poll

Soul Train Music Awards

NME Awards

Other awards and honors

National Association of Recording Merchandisers (NARM) – Top Female Vocalist – 1964, 1966, 1967, 1968, 1969, 1970, 1971
National Academy of Popular Music/Songwriters Hall of Fame – Hitmaker Award – 2001
Woman of the Year – 1969 Harvard Hasty Pudding Society
Cannes Film Festival Palme d'Or nominee – Slaves – 1969
Playboy magazine music poll – Top Female Vocalist – 1971
Playboy magazine's All-Star Band for 1971 – Female Vocals
National Association of Television and Radio Announcers - #1 R&B Vocalist – 1971
Memphis Music Awards – Outstanding Female Vocalist – 1971
1980 Tokyo Intl POP Music Festival for her performance of "Feeling Old Feelings" from her Arista debut album Dionne produced by Barry Manilow. The song was awarded Song of the Year (the equivalent of the Japanese Grammy).
Mayors Award and Key to the City – San Jose, California, 1968
ACE Award nominee for Sisters in the Name of Love (HBO, 1986)
United States Ambassador of Health – appointed by Ronald Reagan in 1987
Kleenex American Hero Award – 1987
American Society of Young Musicians – Luminary Award – 1997
National Music Foundation – Cultural Impact Award – 1998
United Nations Global Ambassador for the Food and Agriculture Organization (FAO) – appointed 2002
NABFEME Shero Award (National Association of Black Female Executives in Music & Entertainment) – 2006
Temecula Valley International Film & Music Festival – Lifetime Career Achievement Award – 2006
Miami-Dade Life Time Achievement Award – 2007 and Dionne Warwick Day – May 25
Starlight Foundation – Humanitarian of the Year Award
Bella Rackoff Women in Film – Humanitarian Award
Lincoln Elementary School in East Orange, New Jersey, honored her by renaming it to the Dionne Warwick Institute of Economics and Entrepreneurship.
Howard Theatre Restoration Honoree – 2013
Living Legend Award, Black Girls Rock! – 2012
Marian Anderson Award – 2017

Filmography 

Concerts
 1966: Live from the Olympia in Paris-Sacha Distel and Dionne Warwick – Radiodiffusion-Télévision Française
 1975: Dionne Warwick Live in Concert – nationally syndicated
 1975: Dionne Warwick: In Performance at Wolftrap – PBS
 1977: Dionne Warwick with the Edmonton Symphony – PBS
 1978: Dionne Warwick: Live at The Forum
 1980: Dionne Warwick: Live at the Park West – HBO
 1982: Dionne Warwick: Live from Lake Tahoe – HBO
 1983: Dionne Warwick: Live at the Rialto – PBS
1985:  Dionne Warwick: Live at the Royal Albert Hall ITV
 1986: Sisters in the Name of Love, with Patti LaBelle and Gladys Knight – HBO
 1987: Dionne Warwick: Live in Japan
 1988: Dionne Warwick with the Boston Pops – PBS
 1988: Dionne Warwick: That's What Friends Are For Benefit Concert – HBO
 1988: Dionne Warwick Live in London – BBC
 1989: Dionne Warwick: Live in Australia – ABC
 1989: Dionne Warwick: That's What Friends Are For Benefit Concert – HBO
 1990: Dionne Warwick and Friends: That's What Friends Are For Benefit Concert – HBO
 1995: Dionne Warwick and Burt Bacharach – Live from the Rainbow Room – A & E Network
 2005: Prime Concerts: In Concert with Edmonton Symphony PBS
 2007: Dionne Warwick — Live
 2008: Cabaret: Live in Cabaret July 18, 1975

As an actress
 1969: Slaves (film) – lead role – Cassy
 1970: The Name of the Game-I Love You Billy Baker – Part I
 1970: The Name of the Game-I Love You Billy Baker – Part II
 1971: The Love Machine (movie) – cameo appearance and performer (main theme singer – "He's Movin' On" and "Amanda")
 1976: Switch – Sherry (Season One)
 1977: Rockford Files (TV series) – Theda Moran
 1977: Switch – Sherry (Season 3)
 1977: Switch – Sherry – Part II
 1988: Rent-A-Cop (film) – Beth Connors
 1991: Extralarge-Black and White (TV film)
 1991: Extralarge-Miami Killer (TV film)
 1991: Extralarge-Black Magic (TV film)
 1992: Extralarge-Cannonball (TV film)
 1992: Captain Planet and the Planeteers – Dr. Russell
 1996: The Wayans Bros. – Mrs. Jackson
 1997: The Drew Carey Show – Season 3, Episode 9 cameo appearance
 1998: The Bold and the Beautiful (1 episode)
 1998: The Wayans Bros. (1 episode)
 1999: Johnny Bravo (Season 2, Episode 3, "Karma Krisis")
 1999: Happily Ever After: Fairy Tales for Every Child – Miss Kitty
 1999: So Weird (Season 1, Episode 12 – "Lost")
 2000: Walker, Texas Ranger (Season 9, Episode 10, "Faith")
 2017: Let There Be Light – self
 2020: The Masked Singer – the Mouse/herself
 2021: Saturday Night Live - self
Documentary film appearances
 1968: Dionne Warwick: Don't Make Me Over – documentary by Gary Keys
 1977: The Day the Music Died
 2002: The Making and Meaning of We Are Family
 2001: The Teens Who Stole Popular Music – A & E Films
 2001: Don't Make Me Over: The Dionne Warwick Story – A & E Films
 2011: Michael Jackson: The Life of an Icon
 2013: Voices of Love-Featuring Whitney Houston, Dionne Warwick, Cissy Houston & The Drinkard Singers – documentary by Gary Keys
 2021: Dionne Warwick: Don't Make Me Over
Compilations, series, and specials
 1963: American Bandstand – ABC: Performing Don't Make Me Over
 1963: American Bandstand – ABC: Performing Anyone Who Had a Heart
 1964: American Bandstand – ABC: Performing Walk On By
 1964: American Bandstand – ABC: Performing Reach Out For Me
 1965: The Danny Kaye Show – CBS
 1965: The Tonight Show – NBC – Multiple appearances
 1965: Hullaballoo – NBC – Multiple appearances
 1966: Hullaballoo – NBC – Multiple appearances
 1966: American Bandstand – ABC: Performing Message to Michael
 1966: American Bandstand – ABC: Performing Trains, Boats and Planes
 1966: The Red Skelton Show – CBS: Performing Walk on By, People
 1966: The Tonight Show – NBC – Multiple appearances
 1967: American Bandstand – ABC: Performing Another Night
 1967: The Ed Sullivan Show – CBS:  Performing Alfie, The Way You Look Tonight
 1967: The 39th Annual Academy Awards – NBC:  Performing Alfie
 1967: The Red Skelton Show – CBS: Performing I Say A little Prayer
 1967: Tin Pan Alley Today – NBC Television Network Special – Star
 1970: The Dean Martin Show – NBC – Performing Paper Mache
 1968: The Ed Sullivan Show – CBS: Performing I Say A little Prayer
 1968: The Carol Burnett Show – CBS: Performing (Theme from) Valley of the Dolls; Children Go Where I Send Thee
 1968: American Bandstand – ABC: Performing Do You Know the Way to San Jose
 1968: The Beautiful Phyllis Diller Show – NBC: Performing Promises, Promises and Do You Know the Way to San Jose
 1968: The Ed Sullivan Show – CBS: Performing Battle Hymn of the Republic
 1968: The Ed Sullivan Show – CBS: Performing Promises, Promises
 1968: The Tonight Show – NBC – Multiple appearances
 1967: The Dick Cavett Show – ABC – Multiple appearances
 1969: The Merv Griffin Show – Guest Host
 1969: The Jose Feliciano Special – NBC – Performing What the World Needs Now and Alfie with Burt Bacharach
 1969: The Dick Cavett Show – ABC – Multiple performances
 1969: The Tonight Show – NBC – Multiple appearances
 1969: Dionne Warwick: Souled Out – CBS Television with Warwick's guests Burt Bacharach, Creedence Clearwater Revival and Glen Campbell
 1970: The Dean Martin Show – NBC – Performing Paper Mache
 1970: An Evening with Burt Bacharach: Special Guest Dionne Warwick – NBC
 1970: The Carol Burnett Show – CBS: Performing (There's) Always Something There to Remind Me and What the World Needs Now
 1970: The Tonight Show – NBC – Multiple appearances
 1971: The Tonight Show – NBC – Multiple appearances
 1973: The Midnight Special: Host – Dionne Warwick – NBC
 1974: The Dionne Warwick Special – nationally syndicated
 1975: Music Country USA-Host Dionne Warwick – NBC
 1975: The Dionne Warwick Show – nationally syndicated
 1976: The Original Rompin' Stompin', Hot & Heavy, Cool & Groovy All-Star Jazz Show – Host Dionne Warwick with Count Basie
 1978: Dionne Warwick -Live from DC- Dick Clark – ABC
 1979: Solid Gold Countdown 1979 – Hosts Dionne Warwick and Glen Campbell
 1980–1981 and 1985–1986: Solid Gold – Series Host
 1982: To Basie with Love - Host
 1982 I Love Liberty - performer
 1990–1991: Dionne!-(Talk Show) – Host – Nationally Syndicated
 2002: A Tribute to Burt Bacharach & Hal David
 2005: The 5th Dimension Travelling Sunshine Show
 2005: Straight from the Heart Live, Vol. 1
 2006: Flashbacks: Soul Sensations
 2006: Flashbacks: Pop Parade
 2008: Lost Concerts Series: Uptown Divas
 2011: The Celebrity Apprentice 4 – Contestant
 2018: The Four: Battle For Stardom – Cameo/Appearance, Warwick's Granddaughter "Cheyenne Elliot" performed for the Judges on the show.

Notes

References 

Harvey, Stephen: What's It All About Dionne? Interview – Dionne Warwick , The Independent on Sunday, February 23, 2003
Ayres, Sabra: Dionne Warwick's Charges Dropped in Plea Bargain, Associated Press, June 5, 2002.

Current Biography. H. W. Wilson, Company. Current Biography Yearbook 1969. Subject: Dionne Warwick. 1969. H.W. Wilson Company, Chicago, Ill.
Current Biography. H. W. Wilson, Company. Current Biography Yearbook 1971. Subject: Burt Bacharach. 1971. H.W. Wilson Company, Chicago, Ill.
Hitmakers: The Teens Who Stole Popular Music: Dionne Warwick – Don't Make Me Over. Performers – Dionne Warwick main subject, Burt Bacharach, Dee Dee Warwick, Dick Clark, et al. A&E Entertainment Video. 2002.
Hitmakers: Burt Bacharach. Performers-Burt Bacharach main subject, Dionne Warwick, Angie Dickinson, Steve Lawrence, et al. A&E Entertainment Video. 2002.
Lifetime Television's Intimate Portrait: Dionne Warwick. Performers: Dionne Warwick, Lee Warrick, David Elliott, Damon Elliott, Cissy Houston, et al. Lifetime Entertainment Video. 2004.
"Dionne Warwick Profile". People. October 15, 1979. Time-Warner, Inc.
"Dionne Warwick". Rolling Stone, November 15, 1979. Rolling Stone Press.
"Dionne the Universal Warwick". Ebony, May 1968. Johnson Publications.
"The Sound of the Sixties". Time. May 21, 1965. Time, Inc.
"Spreading the Faith". Time. July 14, 1967. Time, Inc.
"Dionne Warwick Married". Time. September 8, 1967. Time, Inc.

External links 

[ AllMusic page]
VH1 Site 
Rolling Stone site
[ Billboard chart history (since 1983)]
The Scepter Records Story

 
1940 births
20th-century African-American women singers
20th-century American actresses
20th-century American singers
20th-century American women singers
21st-century African-American women singers
21st-century American actresses
21st-century American singers
21st-century American women singers
African-American actresses
African-American Christians
Allegorical sculptures in Illinois
American contraltos
American emigrants to Brazil
American gospel singers
American people of Dutch descent
American people who self-identify as being of Native American descent
American soul singers
American women pop singers
Arista Records artists
Ballad musicians
Baptists from New Jersey
Concord Records artists
East Orange High School alumni
Grammy Award winners
Grammy Lifetime Achievement Award winners
Living people
Musicians from East Orange, New Jersey
Participants in American reality television series
Rhino Records artists
Scepter Records artists
Singers from New Jersey
The Apprentice (franchise) contestants
The Drinkard Singers members
The Sweet Inspirations members
Torch singers
University of Hartford Hartt School alumni
Warner Records artists
African-American television hosts